Bernat Pomar (Palma, 1932-2011) was a Mallorcan composer and violinist. His best known work is the Suite de danses de Mallorca.

References

1932 births
2011 deaths
Spanish violinists
Male violinists
People from Palma de Mallorca
Spanish composers
Spanish male composers
20th-century violinists
20th-century Spanish musicians
20th-century Spanish male musicians